Raj na nebu, pakao na Zemlji (Paradise in Heaven, Hell on Earth) is the third studio album by the Serbian alternative rock band Supernaut, released by Beograund in 2000.

Track listing

Personnel 
 Srđan Marković "Đile" (vocals, guitar)
 Saša Radić (bass guitar)
 Aleksandra Arizanović (backing vocals)
 Dejana Jovanović (backing vocals)

References 
 EX YU ROCK enciklopedija 1960-2006, Janjatović Petar; 
 Raj na nebu, pakao na Zemlji at Rateyourmusic

Supernaut (Serbian band) albums
2000 albums
Serbian-language albums